Heinz Lüdi (born 8 October 1958) is a retired football defender.

During his club career, Lüdi played for FC Grenchen, FC Zürich, Neuchâtel Xamax and FC Baden. He also represented the Swiss national team.

Lüdi won the Swiss Footballer of the Year in 1981.

External links
 
 

1958 births
Living people
Swiss men's footballers
Switzerland international footballers
Association football defenders
FC Zürich players
Neuchâtel Xamax FCS players